Habroloma is a genus of beetles in the family Buprestidae, containing the following species:

 Habroloma absterrens (Obenberger, 1937)
 Habroloma acceptum (Kerremans, 1894)
 Habroloma accomodatum (Obenberger, 1937)
 Habroloma acuminatum (Deyrolle, 1864)
 Habroloma acutum (Kerremans, 1893)
 Habroloma aeneocupreum (Kerremans, 1890)
 Habroloma aeneolum (Kerremans, 1900)
 Habroloma aeneopygum (Deyrolle, 1864)
 Habroloma aetatulum (Obenberger, 1937)
 Habroloma affinis (Kerremans, 1900)
 Habroloma aglaogeum (Obenberger, 1929)
 Habroloma albographum (Deyrolle, 1864)
 Habroloma albomaculatum (Deyrolle, 1864)
 Habroloma albopictum (Kerremans, 1895)
 Habroloma alphaxium (Obenberger, 1929)
 Habroloma amabilis (Kerremans, 1900)
 Habroloma amplicollis Descarpentries & Villiers, 1966
 Habroloma anchiale (Obenberger, 1929)
 Habroloma andaicum (Kerremans, 1900)
 Habroloma andrei Descarpentries & Villiers, 1964
 Habroloma androgaeum (Obenberger, 1930)
 Habroloma andromache (Obenberger, 1929)
 Habroloma angilium (Obenberger, 1930)
 Habroloma anita (Obenberger, 1929)
 Habroloma annulatum Descarpentries & Villiers, 1964
 Habroloma antiquum (Kerremans, 1900)
 Habroloma antonia (Obenberger, 1929)
 Habroloma apellum (Obenberger, 1929)
 Habroloma apicatum (Chevrolat, 1838)
 Habroloma arche (Obenberger, 1929)
 Habroloma argathrum (Obenberger, 1937)
 Habroloma argenteum (Motschulsky, 1861)
 Habroloma asahinai Kurosawa, 1959
 Habroloma astraeum (Obenberger, 1929)
 Habroloma atronitidum (Gebhardt, 1929)
 Habroloma auberti (Théry, 1912)
 Habroloma aureum Semenov, 1890
 Habroloma australasiae (Gestro, 1877)
 Habroloma australis (Macleay, 1888)
 Habroloma babakanum (Fisher, 1935)
 Habroloma baebium (Obenberger, 1929)
 Habroloma bakerianum (Obenberger, 1924)
 Habroloma bangueyanum (Kerremans, 1900)
 Habroloma basilicum (Deyrolle, 1864)
 Habroloma baucis (Obenberger, 1929)
 Habroloma baudoni Descarpentries & Villiers, 1966
 Habroloma baumi (Obenberger, 1929)
 Habroloma benguetense (Obenberger, 1930)
 Habroloma berenice (Obenberger, 1929)
 Habroloma bicarinatum (Kerremans, 1892)
 Habroloma bifrons (Kiesenwetter in Kraatz & Kiesenwetter, 1879)
 Habroloma binhense Descarpentries & Villiers, 1964
 Habroloma borchsenii Alexeev, 1989
 Habroloma brachycephalum (Gebhardt, 1929)
 Habroloma breiti (Obenberger, 1918)
 Habroloma caium (Obenberger, 1930)
 Habroloma callisto (Obenberger, 1930)
 Habroloma calypso (Obenberger, 1929)
 Habroloma camerunicum (Kerremans, 1899)
 Habroloma canace (Obenberger, 1929)
 Habroloma canidium (Obenberger, 1930)
 Habroloma capense (Gory, 1841)
 Habroloma carinatum (Deyrolle, 1864)
 Habroloma carnum (Obenberger, 1930)
 Habroloma cassiope (Obenberger, 1929)
 Habroloma ceres (Obenberger, 1929)
 Habroloma cheni Théry, 1935
 Habroloma chromatum (Deyrolle, 1864)
 Habroloma circe (Obenberger, 1929)
 Habroloma clotho (Obenberger, 1929)
 Habroloma clymene (Obenberger, 1929)
 Habroloma clythium (Obenberger, 1930)
 Habroloma confinis (Kerremans, 1894)
 Habroloma confusum (Deyrolle, 1864)
 Habroloma congener (Kerremans, 1900)
 Habroloma conscriptum (Obenberger, 1924)
 Habroloma coomani Descarpentries & Villiers, 1964
 Habroloma cornutum (Kerremans, 1914)
 Habroloma corpulentum (Kerremans, 1900)
 Habroloma costipennis (Kerremans, 1900)
 Habroloma crataeis (Obenberger, 1930)
 Habroloma cuneiformis (Fisher, 1921)
 Habroloma cupricaudum (Deyrolle, 1864)
 Habroloma curvifrons (Kerremans, 1900)
 Habroloma dajakorum (Obenberger, 1924)
 Habroloma daoense Descarpentries & Villiers, 1964
 Habroloma davidianum (Obenberger, 1930)
 Habroloma decoratum (Deyrolle, 1864)
 Habroloma decorum (Deyrolle, 1864)
 Habroloma delectabilis (Kerremans, 1900)
 Habroloma dentiscapum Descarpentries & Villiers, 1966
 Habroloma depressifrons (Deyrolle, 1864)
 Habroloma dessumi Descarpentries & Villiers, 1966
 Habroloma discophorum (Kerremans, 1912)
 Habroloma discretum (Kerremans, 1903)
 Habroloma dissimilis (Kerremans, 1900)
 Habroloma drusillum (Obenberger, 1929)
 Habroloma echidnum (Obenberger, 1929)
 Habroloma edusum (Obenberger, 1930)
 Habroloma egerium (Obenberger, 1930)
 Habroloma elissa (Obenberger, 1929)
 Habroloma elyssium (Obenberger, 1930)
 Habroloma embrikstrandellum (Obenberger, 1936)
 Habroloma ennium (Obenberger, 1937)
 Habroloma ephyrum (Obenberger, 1930)
 Habroloma epimethis (Obenberger, 1937)
 Habroloma erichtho (Obenberger, 1929)
 Habroloma erigone (Obenberger, 1930)
 Habroloma eriphylum (Obenberger, 1930)
 Habroloma euchariessum (Gebhardt, 1929)
 Habroloma euchloris (Obenberger, 1930)
 Habroloma eximium (Lewis, 1893)
 Habroloma fasciatum (Gory & Laporte, 1840)
 Habroloma frater Descarpentries & Villiers, 1964
 Habroloma fraternum (Kerremans, 1900)
 Habroloma frenchi (van de Poll, 1887)
 Habroloma gamadegum (Obenberger, 1937)
 Habroloma gardneri Théry, 1930
 Habroloma gaylae Bellamy, 1999
 Habroloma gentilis (Kerremans, 1894)
 Habroloma glabrum (Fisher, 1921)
 Habroloma glyphicum Holynski, 2003
 Habroloma gnomum Holynski, 2003
 Habroloma gracilis (Obenberger, 1921)
 Habroloma gratiosissimum (Obenberger, 1937)
 Habroloma griseonigrum (Saunders, 1873)
 Habroloma hewitti (Kerremans, 1912)
 Habroloma hikosanense Kurosawa, 1959
 Habroloma hilaris (Kerremans, 1894)
 Habroloma hofferi (Obenberger, 1937)
 Habroloma hoscheki (Obenberger, 1917)
 Habroloma hovasianum (Kerremans, 1903)
 Habroloma hovum (Théry, 1905)
 Habroloma humeralis (Kerremans, 1895)
 Habroloma humilis (Deyrolle, 1864)
 Habroloma hyale (Obenberger, 1930)
 Habroloma ignotum (Kerremans, 1900)
 Habroloma insidiosum (Kerremans, 1900)
 Habroloma integrum (Kerremans, 1892)
 Habroloma irregularis (Deyrolle, 1864)
 Habroloma jacobsoni (Fisher, 1926)
 Habroloma jolas (Obenberger, 1930)
 Habroloma kedahae (Fisher, 1930)
 Habroloma kinabalense (Fisher, 1932)
 Habroloma klossi (Fisher, 1930)
 Habroloma konbirense (Kerremans, 1900)
 Habroloma lacunosum (Deyrolle, 1864)
 Habroloma laetum (Kerremans, 1894)
 Habroloma lagerstroemiae Descarpentries, 1958
 Habroloma lalage (Obenberger, 1929)
 Habroloma lanceolatum (Kerremans, 1895)
 Habroloma languidum (Kerremans, 1894)
 Habroloma laosense Descarpentries & Villiers, 1966
 Habroloma lateroalbum Ohmomo, 2004
 Habroloma laticollis (Deyrolle, 1864)
 Habroloma laxulum (Obenberger, 1952)
 Habroloma lepidopterum (Deyrolle, 1864)
 Habroloma lewisii (Saunders, 1873)
 Habroloma lilliputanum (Kerremans, 1890)
 Habroloma lineatum (Kerremans, 1900)
 Habroloma liukiuense (Obenberger, 1940)
 Habroloma longipilis Descarpentries & Villiers, 1964
 Habroloma lubricum (Deyrolle, 1864)
 Habroloma maerum (Obenberger, 1930)
 Habroloma malaccanum (Obenberger, 1929)
 Habroloma marginicolle (Fairmaire, 1888)
 Habroloma massaicum (Kerremans, 1908)
 Habroloma mathiauxi (Théry, 1909)
 Habroloma medeum (Obenberger, 1929)
 Habroloma medium (Kerremans, 1900)
 Habroloma meo Descarpentries & Villiers, 1966
 Habroloma metallicum (Fisher, 1921)
 Habroloma mianum (Obenberger, 1924)
 Habroloma mindanaoense (Fisher, 1921)
 Habroloma minotaurum Holynski, 2003
 Habroloma mirabilis (Kerremans, 1912)
 Habroloma miwai (Obenberger, 1929)
 Habroloma mocquerysi (Théry, 1905)
 Habroloma modestum (Kerremans, 1900)
 Habroloma modicum (Kerremans, 1900)
 Habroloma moestum (Kerremans, 1900)
 Habroloma monardi Théry, 1947
 Habroloma mongolicum Cobos, 1968
 Habroloma monstricornis (Obenberger, 1937)
 Habroloma morosum (Kerremans, 1893)
 Habroloma murinum (Deyrolle, 1864)
 Habroloma myrmecophila Bílý, Fikáček & Sípek, 2008
 Habroloma naghmum (Obenberger, 1937)
 Habroloma nanum (Paykull, 1799)
 Habroloma narangum (Obenberger, 1937)
 Habroloma nausicaum (Obenberger, 1929)
 Habroloma nixilla (Obenberger, 1929)
 Habroloma nobilitatum (Kerremans, 1900)
 Habroloma notatum (Deyrolle, 1864)
 Habroloma nubilum (Deyrolle, 1864)
 Habroloma obsoletum (Chevrolat, 1838)
 Habroloma oreophilum (Fisher, 1930)
 Habroloma orestea (Obenberger, 1929)
 Habroloma palawana (Kerremans, 1898)
 Habroloma parallelicollis (Deyrolle, 1864)
 Habroloma pauperulum (Kerremans, 1896)
 Habroloma paviei Descarpentries & Villiers, 1966
 Habroloma perakae (Fisher, 1933)
 Habroloma perplexum (Kerremans, 1900)
 Habroloma perroti Descarpentries & Villiers, 1964
 Habroloma philippinense (Fisher, 1921)
 Habroloma phrixium (Obenberger, 1929)
 Habroloma picturatum (Deyrolle, 1864)
 Habroloma pigrum (Théry, 1912)
 Habroloma placidum (Kerremans, 1900)
 Habroloma politum (Kerremans, 1892)
 Habroloma pondolanum (Obenberger, 1937)
 Habroloma populum (Deyrolle, 1864)
 Habroloma praorum (Obenberger, 1924)
 Habroloma praxilla (Obenberger, 1929)
 Habroloma preangense (Obenberger, 1924)
 Habroloma pretiosum (Théry, 1904)
 Habroloma pretoriense (Kerremans, 1903)
 Habroloma protracticolle (Obenberger, 1918)
 Habroloma prudens (Kerremans, 1900)
 Habroloma pseudacutum (Obenberger, 1929)
 Habroloma pulicarium (Deyrolle, 1864)
 Habroloma pupillum (Kerremans, 1894)
 Habroloma pustulosum (Fairmaire, 1903)
 Habroloma raffrayi Théry, 1927
 Habroloma regium (Kerremans, 1914)
 Habroloma repetitrix (Obenberger, 1937)
 Habroloma resillum (Deyrolle, 1864)
 Habroloma roscium (Obenberger, 1929)
 Habroloma rubripilis (Obenberger, 1929)
 Habroloma rudis (Kerremans, 1892)
 Habroloma rufoapicalis Descarpentries & Villiers, 1964
 Habroloma rugatum (Kerremans, 1892)
 Habroloma rungsi Baudon, 1959
 Habroloma salisburyense (Obenberger, 1937)
 Habroloma sandakanum (Obenberger, 1924)
 Habroloma sassum (Obenberger, 1952)
 Habroloma saundersi (Lewis, 1893)
 Habroloma saundersianum (Obenberger, 1924)
 Habroloma sellatulum (Obenberger, 1930)
 Habroloma sembilanense (Obenberger, 1929)
 Habroloma septimia (Obenberger, 1929)
 Habroloma setosulum (Deyrolle, 1864)
 Habroloma simplex (Deyrolle, 1864)
 Habroloma sincerum (Kerremans, 1900)
 Habroloma singhalesum (Obenberger, 1929)
 Habroloma sinnicum (Obenberger, 1929)
 Habroloma socialis (Lea, 1894)
 Habroloma soror Descarpentries & Villiers, 1964
 Habroloma sparsum (Kerremans, 1893)
 Habroloma speciosellum (Obenberger, 1924)
 Habroloma spinicornis Descarpentries & Villiers, 1964
 Habroloma stigmaticum (Kerremans, 1892)
 Habroloma subalutaceum (Pic, 1921)
 Habroloma subbicorne (Motshulsky, 1860)
 Habroloma subfasciatum (Kerremans, 1894)
 Habroloma taciturnum (Kerremans, 1894)
 Habroloma tangonense Descarpentries & Villiers, 1966
 Habroloma taygeto (Obenberger, 1929)
 Habroloma tecmessa (Obenberger, 1929)
 Habroloma tetrum (Kerremans, 1900)
 Habroloma thamentis (Obenberger, 1937)
 Habroloma theryi Rungs, 1936
 Habroloma thomasseti (Théry, 1928)
 Habroloma topali (Holynski, 1981)
 Habroloma triangulare (Lacordaire, 1835)
 Habroloma tyanum (Obenberger, 1937)
 Habroloma tyli (Obenberger, 1930)
 Habroloma uniformatum (Obenberger, 1924)
 Habroloma vansoni (Obenberger, 1937)
 Habroloma variegatum (Deyrolle, 1864)
 Habroloma velutinum Théry, 1912
 Habroloma vestum (Obenberger, 1929)
 Habroloma vexator (Kerremans, 1892)
 Habroloma vientianense Descarpentries & Villiers, 1966
 Habroloma vilis (Deyrolle, 1864)
 Habroloma viridipenne Théry, 1940
 Habroloma vividum (Théry, 1905)
 Habroloma wagneri (Gebhardt, 1928)
 Habroloma weyersi (Kerremans, 1900)
 Habroloma xamarthum (Obenberger, 1937)
 Habroloma xargenteum (Motschulsky, 1861)
 Habroloma yuasai Kurosawa, 1976
 Habroloma zaghanum (Obenberger, 1937)
 Habroloma zululanum (Obenberger, 1938)

References

Buprestidae genera